Chārpāte is a village in Myitkyina Township in Myitkyina District in the Kachin State of north-eastern Burma. It is located 3.1 miles from the city of Myitkyina.

Nearby towns and villages include Namkwi (1.8 nm), Namyu (7.0 nm), Mankrin (1.8 nm), Nawngnang (3.4 nm),  and Radhapur (1.3 nm).

References

Populated places in Kachin State